is a racing video game series developed and published for arcade systems and home game consoles by Bandai Namco Entertainment, formerly Namco. The first game, Ridge Racer (1993), was originally released in arcades for the Namco System 22 hardware, later ported to the PlayStation two years later as a launch title. It was met with several sequels and spin-off games for multiple platforms, the latest being the Android and iOS game Ridge Racer Draw & Drift (2016). Gameplay involves the player racing against computer-controlled opponents to be the first to finish in a race. Drifting is a core aspect of the series, and is used to keep speed while turning corners.

Ridge Racer is a spiritual successor to Sim Drive (1992), a racing simulation game met with a limited release in Japanese arcades. Originally meant as an F1 racing game, similar to Namco's own Pole Position and Final Lap series, it was instead replaced with racing on mountain roads, a popular trend for Japanese car enthusiasts at the time. The PlayStation version was a launch title for the console and an astounding success for Namco, prompting the creation of several sequels for arcades and home platforms. After Namco merged with Bandai in 2005, the series would become exclusive to consoles and later mobile phones. Several games in the franchise were released as launch titles for consoles.

Earlier Ridge Racer games received critical acclaim for their graphics, gameplay, and musical score, many citing it as a contributing factor to the success of the PlayStation in its early years. Later entries were criticized for straying too far from the source material and lack of content, with Ridge Racer Vita (2011) being listed among the worst video games ever made. The series is considered influential to the racing game genre.

Games

 Ridge Racer (1993) is the first entry in the series, originally released for arcades and running on the Namco System 22 arcade system. A PlayStation conversion was released in 1994 and 1995 as a launch title for the console. Two other versions of the game were released for arcades: Ridge Racer Full Scale, which featured a replica Eunos Roadster that the player sat in to control the game, and Ridge Racer: 3-Screen Edition, which used three different monitors to provide a peripheral vision effect, similar to Namco's earlier game Driver's Eyes (1991). A Japanese mobile phone version was released in 2000. The game was also released for J2ME in 2006 and Zeebo in 2009.
 Ridge Racer 2 (1994) was released for arcades, running on the Namco System 22 hardware. It serves as an update to the original game, featuring multiplayer, a rear-view mirror, and a remixed soundtrack composed by Shinji Hosoe.
 Rave Racer (1995) was released for arcades. It features two new tracks alongside the two present in the original Ridge Racer, and had linkable arcade cabinets that allowed for up to eight-person multiplayer. Home conversions for both the PlayStation and Microsoft Windows were announced in 1996, but were later cancelled.
 Ridge Racer Revolution (1995) was released for the PlayStation. It is a modified home release of Ridge Racer 2 with three completely new and different tracks than the arcade and original games, new music, additional vehicles, and multiplayer via the PlayStation Link Cable peripheral.
 Rage Racer (1996) was released for the PlayStation. Alongside the introduction of series mascot Reiko Nagase, it featured customizable cars and a retries rule, both of which have become prominent throughout the franchise. It also features a more gritty and darker graphical style, a departure from the series' more colorful art style.
 Pocket Racer (1996) is a spin-off arcade game released exclusively in Japan. Gameplay is near identical to the original Ridge Racer, but all the cars have instead been replaced with "super-deformed" Choro-Q-esc vehicles. A similar concept was included with Ridge Racer Revolution, titled Buggy Mode, which served as the inspiration for Pocket Racer.
 R4: Ridge Racer Type 4 (1998) was released for the PlayStation, titled Ridge Racer Type 4 in Europe. It marks the debut of racing teams, which became a core aspect for all games to follow, and is the first in the series to use Gouraud shading for its graphics. Multiplayer modes are also present, being displayed in a split-screen orientation. In 2018, it was released as one of the built-in games on the PlayStation Classic mini console.
 Ridge Racer 64 (2000) was released for the Nintendo 64 in North America and Europe; it was not developed by Namco, but by Nintendo Software Technology. It includes tracks from Ridge Racer and Ridge Racer Revolution, alongside new tracks and cars.
 Ridge Racer V (2000) was released as a launch title for the PlayStation 2. An arcade version was released a year later, subtitled Arcade Battle. The original Ridge Racer game's free-form structure is instead replaced with Grand Prix races found in Ridge Racer Type 4.
 R: Racing Evolution (2003) was released for the GameCube, PlayStation 2 and Xbox, serving as a spin-off of the franchise. The European release was titled R: Racing and published by Nintendo. It includes over 33 licensed vehicles from real-world car manufacturers, including the 24 Hours of Le Mans and Super GT. The game also has a story mode. Some releases of the GameCube version include Pac-Man Vs. as a free bonus.
 Ridge Racer DS (2004) was released as a launch title for the Nintendo DS. A remake of Ridge Racer 64, it includes touch-screen controls that allow the player to use the stylus to steer the car, alongside a multiplayer mode via local wireless multiplayer.
 Ridge Racer (2004) was released as a launch title for the PlayStation Portable, and was titled Ridge Racers in Japan. It features tracks, cars and music found in earlier Ridge Racer games, leading it to be described as a "compilation" of the series. The Japanese version was re-released as a budget title a year later under the PSP The Best label.
 Critical Velocity (2005) is a plot-based spin-off game released in Japan for the PlayStation 2. Known in development as Rune Chaser, it features Ridge Racer vehicles and settings in a more adventure-like game with a storyline.
 Ridge Racer 6 (2005) was released as a launch title for the Xbox 360, featuring a total of 130 vehicles and 30 playable tracks, alongside 14-person online multiplayer through Xbox Live. The game's soundtrack was released through Xbox Live by SuperSweep Records in 2009, titled Ridge Racer 6 Direct Audio.
 Ridge Racer 2 (2006) was released for the PlayStation Portable and was named Ridge Racers 2 in Japan keeping the unique PSP naming scheme. The European release was published by Sony Computer Entertainment Europe. It is a direct sequel to the 2004 Ridge Racers and retains the same concept of the first game featuring tracks, cars and music taken from earlier games in the franchise. 
 Ridge Racer 7 (2006) was released as a launch title for the PlayStation 3.
 Pachi-slot Ridge Racer (2008) is a pachi-slot spin-off of the series, released in Japan. A digital remake was released for the PlayStation 2 in Japan later the same year.
 Pachi-slot Ridge Racer 2 (2009) is a direct sequel to Pachi-slot Ridge Racer, again released in Japan.
 Ridge Racer Accelerated (2009) was released for iOS devices.
 Ridge Racer Drift (2010) was released for J2ME, Windows Mobile, BREW and BlackBerry devices.
 Ridge Racer 3D (2011) was released as a launch title for the Nintendo 3DS. 
 Ridge Racer (2011) was released as a launch title for the PlayStation Vita.
 Ridge Racer Unbounded (2012) was released for the Xbox 360, PlayStation 3 and Microsoft Windows. The game is a large departure from the series' core gameplay, instead focusing on vehicular combat akin to the Burnout series.
 Ridge Racer Slipstream (2013) was released for iOS and Android devices.
 Ridge Racer Draw & Drift (2016) was released for iOS and Android devices.

Common elements

The basic gameplay of the Ridge Racer series has remained relatively consistent throughout each installment. The objective is to race against computer-controlled opponents to finish each track in first place — the player begins the game in last place, and have a limited number of laps around the track to complete where they can overtake opponents. Some entries have a time limit that the player must race against, with each completed lap extending the timer; if the timer reaches zero, the game ends regardless of which lap the player was on. Later entries remove the timer and instead requires the player to finish the race in a minimum-assigned place to advance to the next course.

Unlike other racing games, which usually feature closed circuits, Ridge Racer instead has races laid out on streets, beaches, cities and mountains, taking place in the fictional coastal metropolis "Ridge City" — circuit tracks are included in some entries. Nearly every entry in the series features the original tracks from Ridge Racer and Ridge Racer 2, sometimes modified to accompany for certain mechanics. Players can drift their car around corners to maintain speed, as most of the tracks were based on real-world locations that were not intended for race speeds. Ridge Racer Unbounded (2012) removes the drifting mechanic in favor of vehicular combat, similar to the Burnout franchise.

The playable cars each have their own stats and mechanics, such as a faster speed or improved drifting. Many of these are also named after older Namco video games, including Dig Dug, Xevious, NebulasRay, Rolling Thunder, Bosconian and Solvalou. The PlayStation sequel R4: Ridge Racer Type 4 introduces the concept of racing teams for the series, all being named after Dig Dug, Mappy, Pac-Man, Xevious and Galaga. Similar to Namco's own Tekken series, several games feature classic Namco arcade games as short minigames that play during loading screens, a mechanic that was later trademarked by Namco — the PlayStation home port of the original Ridge Racer features Galaxian, while Ridge Racers features New Rally-X. Completing these minigames will award the player with new tracks or cars, sometimes unlocking a full emulated version of the minigame to play.

Automakers
Starting with Rage Racer, each game offers cars with fictional automakers and model names. Certain manufacturers specialize in a particular component of their cars' performance, such as top speed, grip, and acceleration:

 Kamata – A Japanese brand specializing in basic all-rounder sports coupes and hatchbacks. They also make the Angelus supercar, one of the fastest cars in the entire series.
 Terrazi – A Japanese brand specializing in all-rounder cars with bizarre designs, including the Wildboar (a futuristic three-wheeled car exclusive to Ridge Racer Type 4).
 Lizard/Danver – An American brand specializing in muscle and sports cars with high acceleration.
 Âge (Âge Solo in Ridge Racer Type 4) – A French brand specializing in compacts and sports cars with excellent grip.
 Assoluto – An Italian brand specializing in high-performance sports cars and supercars with high top speeds and unique designs.
 Rivelta/Soldat – An Italian brand specializing in sports cars. They also make the Rumeur hatchback, a car with incredible top speed and handling.
 Gnade – A German brand specializing in all-rounder luxury and sports coupes and sedans.
 Himmel – A German brand specializing in sports cars.
 Sinseong Motors – A South Korean brand exclusive to Ridge Racer 7 that specializes in luxury sports coupes.

Reception

The original Ridge Racer was very well received by critics for its 3D graphics, audio, and the drifting mechanics. It also received an admirable port to the PlayStation, where it became one of the best selling titles in the console's early lifetime. It is also considered as playing a part in giving Sony's system an edge over rival Sega's Saturn during 1994–1995.

Its sequels during the 1990s were also highly successful, in particular Ridge Racer Type 4, often considered the series' best. Its sequel Ridge Racer V received more mediocre reviews, but the subsequent PSP title achieved very high praise. The series' 'idol' mascot Reiko Nagase, who has appeared in most games since 1996's Rage Racer, has often been rated among the most recognizable female characters in video games.

In 1999, Next Generation listed the Ridge Racer series as number 11 on their "Top 50 Games of All Time", commenting that "there are certainly better car simulations, but when it comes to fun, Ridge Racer, the game that helped make PlayStation cool, is the one we come back to".

2006's Ridge Racer 7 is considered to have been the series' peak before declining in popularity - the Vita title was negatively received for various reasons, whilst the latest console game, Ridge Racer Unbounded, was marked with a departure from the drifting style and mechanics of what the series is known for, experimenting with a more destructive style similar to the Burnout series, although Ridge Racer 3D, a launch title for the 3DS, was better received compared to Vita and Unbounded. The game was never as popular as its previous main titles and never had a Japanese release either.

Notes

References

External links
Official series website

 
Bandai Namco Entertainment franchises
Video game franchises introduced in 1993